The Swedish Peace and Arbitration Society (SPAS) is a non-governmental organization in Sweden, dedicated to peace, disarmament and democratization. It operates by methods including publishing, lobbying, activism and participating in political debates. SPAS has published an array of books and reports. The name of the organization's member's magazine is Pax. SPAS' central office is situated in Stockholm, headed by current president Agnes Hellström. However, there are about 20 local branches throughout Sweden. The society has a total of about 8500 members.

History
The Swedish Peace and Arbitration Society is the world's oldest peace organization, and Scandinavia's largest today. It was founded in 1883 by 50 Swedish parliamentarians and headed by Klas Pontus Arnoldson, who was awarded the 1908 Nobel Peace Prize.

Among SPAS' notable achievements are:
 Assisting the peaceful resolution of the dissolution of the union of Sweden and Norway in 1905; 
 Proposing alternative service for conscientious objectors, which became law in 1920; 
 Forming an 80,000-people human chain between the U.S. and Soviet embassies in Stockholm in 1983, and
 Exposing illegal and dubious Swedish arms export deals.

See also
 List of anti-war organizations

References

Peace organizations based in Sweden
1883 establishments in Sweden
Organizations established in 1883